Mohammad Ebrahim Bastani Parizi (12 December 1924 – 25 March 2014; born in Pariz) was an Iranian historian, translator, poet, essayist and author of non-fiction books. His numerous publications (over 50 books) are mostly popular reads on topics such as the history of Iran and the history of his hometown Pariz in Kerman province.

References 

1924 births
2014 deaths
20th-century Iranian historians
Recipients of the Order of Knowledge
People from Sirjan
Faculty of Letters and Humanities of the University of Tehran alumni